Seán O'Sullivan is an Irish sportsman who played Gaelic football for the Kerry senior football team and at club level with Cromane GAA club.

Playing career

Underage
O'Sullivan played with the Kerry minor team in 1998. Wins over Waterford after a re-play and Limerick seen him win a Munster Minor Football Championship medal. O'Sullivan and co lost out to Laois in the All-Ireland semi-final.

Senior
O'Sullivan won his first All-Ireland Senior Football Championship in 2006, after a comprehensive victory over Mayo side in the final on 17 September 2006, in Croke Park. Seán had an exceptional season, being responsible for many of the passes which made Kieran Donaghy a real threat to defences in 2006.

2007 was another successful year for O'Sullivan and Kerry.  The All-Ireland champions won the Munster title and progressed through the All-Ireland series to beat Cork in the final.

O'Sullivan was also a member of the Kerry squad that won its 36th All-Ireland Title in 2009. In December of that year, he announced his retirement from inter-county football.

Managerial career
Since retirement O'Sullivan has become involved in coaching, selector and as a manager. O'Sullivan was announced as manager of South Kerry GAA in March 2021. This came alongside a role as a Kerry under-20 football team selector under the management of Declan O'Sullivan.

References

External links
https://web.archive.org/web/20090722123945/http://www.rte.ie/sport/2006/0917/kerry.html
http://www.rte.ie/sport/2006/0805/kerry.html

Year of birth missing (living people)
Living people
Cromane Gaelic footballers
Gaelic football coaches
Gaelic football managers
Gaelic football selectors
Kerry inter-county Gaelic footballers